A sizable indentured servants' uprising occurred in Virginia in 1661 over the issue of adequate food. The customary ration for servants at the time included meat three times a week. When a planter named Major Goodwin decided to keep his servants on a diet of cornbread and water, discontent followed. Leaders of the servants named Isaac Friend and William Cluton determined to petition the king for redress.

According to one witness, the plot became more troublesome to the plantation owners when Isaac Friend stated, "they would get a matter of Forty of them together and get Gunnes, and he (Cluton) would be the first and lead them and cry as they went along 'who would be for liberty and freed from bondage?' and that there would enough come to them, and they would goe through the country and Kill those that made any opposition, and that they would either be free or die for it". (Punctuation editor's.)

The York county court settled the case by bounding William Cluton over for inciting servants to rebellion, but after several witnesses testified to his good character, the judges discharged him. Isaac Friend escaped punishment as well. The court admonished the masters and magistrates to keep a close watch on their servants. In 1662 a law was passed which restrained servants from "unlawful" meetings under heavy penalties.

See also

List of strikes

References
Labor conflict in the United States, An encyclopedia. edited by Ronald Filippelli, assisted by Carol Reilly - Garland Publishing New York & London 1990

Further reading
"York County Conspiracy of 1661" at Encyclopedia Virginia

Conflicts in 1661
Colony of Virginia
York County, Virginia
Debt bondage
Indentured servitude in the Americas
1661 labor disputes and strikes
1661 in the Thirteen Colonies
Indentured servitude in the Thirteen Colonies